Aldair Cruz dos Santos (born 4 September 1989), known simply as Aldair, is a São Toméan footballer who plays as a midfielder for Belgian club RSD Jette and the São Tomé and Príncipe national team.

He left his country at age 13. He joined Belgian provincial side Bon Air in 2009, leaving it three years later when he moved to Black Star, where he played until 2014 when he signed for RSD Jette. As a result of his long-term current residence in Belgium, he also holds Belgian citizenship.

International career
Aldair made his international debut on 22 March 2017, when he was a starter in a loss Africa Cup of Nations qualifier against Madagascar.

References

External links 
 

1989 births
Living people
People from Mé-Zóchi District
São Tomé and Príncipe footballers
Association football midfielders
São Tomé and Príncipe international footballers
São Tomé and Príncipe expatriate footballers
São Tomé and Príncipe expatriate sportspeople in Belgium
Expatriate footballers in Belgium